The president of the Royal College of Physicians of Ireland (RCPI) is the elected head of the Royal College of Physicians of Ireland.

Presidents of the Royal College of Physicians of Ireland 

1667–1669 John Stearne
1672–1674 Sir Abraham Yarner
1674-1675, 1695-1696, 1701-1702, 1707-1708 Ralph Howard
1675-1677 Charles Willoughby
1677-1681 Robert Waller
1681-1686, 1690-1693, 1696-1697, 1698-1699, 1706-1707 Sir Patrick Dun
1687-1690 (election not confirmed) John Crosby
1694-1695, 1697-1698, 1700-1701 John Madden
1699-1700 Duncan Cumings
1702-1703, 1709-1710, 1713-1714, 1720-1721 Sir Thomas Molyneux, 1st Baronet
1703-1704, 1710 Richard Steevens
1704-1705, 1708-1709, 1710-1711, 1719-1720, 1721-1722 William Smyth
1705-1706, 1711-1712 Robert Griffith
1712-1713, 1723-1724 Patrick Mitchell
1714-1715, 1722-1723, 1738-1739 James Grattan
1715-1716, 1724-1725 Richard Hoyle
1728-1729 Richard Helsham
1717-1718, 1726-1727 Samuel Jemmat
1718-1719, 1727-1728, 1739-1740 Bryan Robinson
1728-1729, 1740-1741 Henry Cope
1729-1730, 1741-1742 Francis LeHunte
1730-1731 Samuel Arnoldi
1731-1732 Thomas Madden
1732-1733 Alexander McNaughten
1733-1734, 1742-1743, 1759-1760 William Stephens
1734-1735 John Van Lewen
1735-1736, 1743-1744 John Hemsworth
1736-1737, 1744-1745 Thomas Kingsbury
1737-1738 Francis Foreside
1745-1746, 1761-1762 Patrick Hewetson
1746-1747 Edward Aston
1747-1748 Edward Smyth
1748-1749, 1760-1761 Robert Robinson
1749-1750 Sir Edward Barry, 1st Baronet
1750-1751 Thomas Lloyd
1751-1752 John Anderson
1752-1753, 1762-1763, 1770-1771, 1773-1774, 1778-1779 John Ferrall
1753-1754, 1763-1764 Ezekiel Nesbitt
1754-1755, 1764-1765, 1769-1770 Constantine Barbor
1755-1756 Anthony Relhan
1756-1757, 1765-1766 Richard Wood
1757-1758 Adam Humble
1758-1759, 1766-1767, 1771-1772, 1774-1775, 1779-1780, 1781-1782 Henry Quin
1767-1768, 1772-1773, 1775-1776 Sir Nathaniel Barry, 2nd Baronet
1768-1769, 1776-1777 Clement Archer
1777-1778, 1780-1781 Francis Hutcheson
1782-1783, 1789-1790, 1795-1796, 1801-1802, 1808-1809, 1813-1814 Edward Hill
1783-1784, 1790-1791, 1796-1797 Arthur Saunders
1784-1785, 1791-1792, 1797-1798, 1800, 1802-1803, 1809-1810, 1814-1815 William Harvey
1785-1786, 1792-1793, 1798-1799, 1803-1804, 1810-1811, 1815-1816 Francis Hopkins
1786-1787, 1793-1794, 1800-1801 Patrick Plunket
1787-1788, 1794-1795, 1799 (resigned) Edmund Cullen
1788-1789 Charles William Quin
1799–1800 Robert Perceval
1804-1805 Alexander Pelissier
1805-1806, 1806-1807, 1811-1812, 1816-1817 James Cleghorn
1807-1808 Daniel Mills
1812-1813, 1818-1819 Thomas Herbert Orpen
1817-1818 Anthony Gilholy
1819-1820, 1827-1828, 1831-1834 Hugh Ferguson
1820-1821 James Callanan
1821-1822 George Francis Todderick
1822-1823 Robert Bredin
1823-1824, 1829-1831 Samuel Litton
1824-1825 John O'Brien
1825-1826 James John Leahy
1826-1827 William Brooke
1828-1829 Charles Richard Alexander Lendrick
1834-1836 Jonathan Osborne
1836-1838 Charles Philips Croker
1838-1841 George Alexander Kennedy
1841-1843, 1845-1847, 1857-1859 Sir Henry Marsh, 1st Baronet
1843-1845 Robert James Graves
1847-1849 Robert Collins
1849-1851, 1866-1867 William Stokes
1851-1853 William Fetherston-Haugh Montgomery
1853-1855 Evory Kennedy
1855-1857 John Mollan
1859-1864 Sir Dominic Corrigan
1864-1866 Thomas Edward Beatty
1867-1869 Fleetwood Churchill
1869-1871 Sir John Thomas Banks
1871-1873 Alfred Hudson
1873-1875 James Foulis Duncan
1875-1878 Samuel Gordon
1878-1880 Henry Haswell Head
1880-1882 George Johnston
1882-1883 William Moore
1884-1886 Sir Francis Richard Cruise
1886-1888 James Little
1888-1890 Lombe Atthill
1890-1892 John Magee Finny
1892-1895 Walter George Smith
1895-1896 Thomas Wrigley Grimshaw
1896-1898 Sir George Frederick Duffey
1898-1900 Sir John William Moore
1900-1902 Sir Christopher Nixon
1902-1904 Sir Arthur Vernon Macan
1904-1906 Sir William Smyly
1906-1908 Sir Joseph Michael Redmond
1908-1910 Sir Andrew Horne
1910-1912 Sir John Hawtrey Benson
1912-1914 Charles Edward Fitzgerald
1914-1916 Ephraim MacDowel Cosgrave
1916-1919 Joseph O'Carroll
1919-1922 Sir James Craig
1922-1924 Michael Francis Cox
1924-1925 Sir William Thompson
1925-1927 Thomas Wilson
1927-1930 William Winter
1930-1933, 1934 Thomas Gillman Moorhead
1933-1934 Francis Carmichael Purser
1934-1937 John Agar Matson
1937-1940 William Boxwell
1940-1943 Robert James Rowlette
1943-1946 William Geoffrey Harvey
1946-1949 Bethel Solomons
1949-1952 Leonard Abrahamson
1952-1955 Edward Freeman
1955-1958 Francis O'Donnell
1958-1960 Patrick O'Farrell
1960-1963 Robert Elsworth Steen
1963-1966 Robert Brian Pringle
1966-1969 Albert Thompson
1969-1972 David Mitchell
1972-1974 William J. E. Jessop
1974-1977 Bryan Alton
1977-1980 Alan Proctor Grant
1980-1983 Dermot Holland
1983-1986, 1989 John Kirker
1986-1988 Ivo Drury
1989-1991 Ciaran Barry
1991-1994 John Stephen Doyle
1994-1997 Stanley Roberts
1997-2000 Brian Keogh
2000-2003 Desmond Canavan
2003-2006 T J McKenna
2006-2007 John F. Murphy
July 2007-2011 John Donohoe
2011-2014 John Crowe
2014-2017 Frank Murray
2017- Mary Horgan

References
 Royal College of Physicians of Ireland Lives of the Presidents

Royal College of Physicians of Ireland
Royal College of Physicians of Ireland
 
Presidents of the Royal College of Physicians of Ireland